The American Curl is a breed of cat characterized by its unusual ears, which curl back from the face toward the center of the back of the skull. The breed originated in Lakewood, California, as the result of a spontaneous mutation.

History
The first American Curls appeared as strays on the door step of the Rugas in Lakewood, California in June 1981. The black female, named Shulamith, gave birth to a litter of cats with the same curled ears, and so became the ancestor of all American Curls today. In 1986, an American Curl was exhibited at a cat show for the first time, and in 1992, the longhaired American Curl was given championship status by The International Cat Association (TICA). In 1999, the American Curl became the first breed admitted to the Cat Fanciers' Association (CFA) Championship Class with both longhair and shorthair divisions.

The American Curl is a medium-sized cat , and does not reach maturity until 2–3 years of age.

American Curl kittens are born with straight ears, which begin to curl within forty-eight hours. After four months, their ears will not curl any longer, and should be hard and stiff to the touch at the base of the ear with flexible tips. A pet quality American Curl may have almost straight ears, but showcats must have ears that curl in an arc between 90 and 180 degrees. A 90 degrees is preferable, but cats will be disqualified if their ears touch the back of their skulls.

Both longhaired and shorthaired American Curls have soft, silky coats which lie flat against their bodies. They require little grooming and enjoy spending time with their owners.

The American Curl, while still an uncommon breed, is found across the world in the United States, Spain, France, Japan, Russia, and many other countries.

Health
Due to its large genetic pool with non-pedigree cats, the American Curl is generally a healthy breed. However, their ears should be handled carefully, as rough handling may damage the cartilage in the ear, and require frequent cleaning to prevent infections.

Various matings between cats with curled ears and cats without curled ears revealed a dominant inheritance of the curl gene. Sex-linked distribution was not found. The mutant gene was designated as curl and is symbolized by Cu. Another mutation of the ear pinna was found in Scottish Fold cats. In these cats, anomalies were rarely found when heterozygous, however, in homozygous (FdFd) cats, animals suffer from dysplasia of the lower limbs and tail. The question arises if homozygous curls (CuCu) could also be affected by cartilage formation defects and bone abnormalities. However, observations of a CuCu cat over two years showed no sign of anomaly.

See also
Cat body type genetic mutations
 Scottish Fold, a breed with ears folding down and forward

References

External links

CFA breed article
TICA page of American Curl Breed
Brief History and Description of American Curls

Cat breeds
Cat breeds originating in the United States
Cat breeds and types with bent ears